is a velodrome located in Iwaki, Fukushima that conducts pari-mutuel Keirin racing - one of Japan's four authorized  where gambling is permitted. Its Keirin identification number for betting purposes is 13# (13 sharp).

Iwaki-Taira's oval is 400 meters in circumference. A typical keirin race of 2,025 meters consists of five laps around the course.

External links

Iwaki-Taira Keirin Home Page (Japanese)
keirin.jp Iwaki-Taira Information (Japanese)

Velodromes in Japan
Sports venues completed in 1951
Sports venues in Fukushima Prefecture
Iwaki, Fukushima
1951 establishments in Japan